Thomas Miller (30 June 1890 – 3 September 1958) was a Scottish footballer who played for Liverpool and the Scotland national team during the early part of the 20th century.

Career

Club
Born in Motherwell, Miller played for Larkhall United and Hamilton Academical before manager Tom Watson brought him to Anfield in February 1912 for £400. Miller made his debut in a home Football League First Division match against The Wednesday on 17 February 1912, a game that finished 1–1, his first goal came a fortnight later on 2 March, a division 1 match, again, at home, and again, in a 1–1 draw, this time with Middlesbrough, a game that saw the debut of a Liverpool great, winger Bill Lacey.

The inside forward was a main stay of the Reds line-up and helped the club reach their first FA Cup on 25 April 1914, unfortunately the game ended in a 1–0 defeat to Burnley. Despite the result the day will always be remembered as it was to be the last time the showpiece final was to be played at the Crystal Palace ground but, more significantly, it was also the first time the final was played in front of a reigning monarch, George V.

Miller's career was interrupted by World War I, but he did return to the Merseyside club in 1919 after its conclusion. He found success, scoring 13 goals in 25 matches, better than a goal every other game. His younger brother John was also at the club by this time but they only appeared in three games together, and John only made the first team eight times in all; the first time the siblings appeared together was in a league game at Boundary Park against Oldham on 2 April 1920, a game that finished 1–1. Two other Miller brothers, William and Adam were also footballers with Hamilton Accies, the latter playing over 250 times for the club.

This 1919–20 season was to be Miller's last for the Reds as he was transferred to bitter rivals Manchester United on 23 September 1920, although not before he managed to earn himself a descent goals-per-game ratio at Anfield scoring 56 times in 146 appearances (averaging a goal every 2.6 games). After a season at Old Trafford, Miller later played for Heart of Midlothian, Torquay, Hamilton for a second spell and Raith Rovers before he drew a curtain on his playing career. He had a short spell as manager of Barrow, during which he recruited his brother John.

International
Miller played for Scotland at international level and played three times, making his debut while he was at Liverpool in a British Championship fixture at Hillsborough on 10 April 1920; Miller scored twice in the first half, but still finished on the losing side as England won 5–4 after being 4–2 down at half-time. He won two further caps in 1921 while at Manchester United (including the coveted England fixture) despite enduring a poor spell at club level, his cause helped by a strong performance and goal in the 'Home Scots v Anglo-Scots' trial match of that year.

References

External links
Player profile at LFChistory.net

1890 births
1958 deaths
Hamilton Academical F.C. players
Liverpool F.C. players
Manchester United F.C. players
Heart of Midlothian F.C. players
Wishaw Thistle F.C. players
Royal Albert F.C. players
Torquay United F.C. players
Raith Rovers F.C. players
Scottish footballers
Scottish football managers
Barrow A.F.C. managers
Scotland international footballers
Scottish Football League players
English Football League players
Association football forwards
Scottish Junior Football Association players
Footballers from Motherwell
Sportspeople involved in betting scandals
British Army personnel of World War I
Gordon Highlanders soldiers
Larkhall United F.C. players
Southern Football League players
FA Cup Final players